Rajnish Kumar may refer to:

 Rajnish Kumar (banker), Indian banker
 Rajnish Kumar (politician), Indian politician
 Rajnish Kumar (peace activist) (born 1967)